Murat Turan (born 27 April 1975) is a Turkish Paralympian Archer competing in the Men's compound bow W2 event.
He is competing at the 2020 Summer Paralympics in the individual compound open event.

He won the silver medal in the Individual compound open and another silver medal with his teammates in the Team compound open events at the 2019 World Para Archery Championships in 's-Hertogenbosch, Netherlands.

References

1975 births
Living people
Sportspeople from Kilis
Turkish male archers
Paralympic archers of Turkey
Wheelchair category Paralympic competitors
Archers at the 2020 Summer Paralympics
Islamic Solidarity Games medalists in archery
21st-century Turkish people